The European Canoe Association (ECA) is the umbrella organization for canoeing sport in Europe. It was founded in Rome, Italy, on December 11, 1993. The organization has 45 member countries. The association was recognized by the International Canoe Federation at the ICF congress in Acapulco in 1994. In reaction to the 2022 Russian invasion of Ukraine, the ECA suspended the participation of Russian and Belarusian athletes, and suspended all officials from Russia and Belarus from officiating at any ECA event, and from attending or taking part in any ECA meetings.

Disciplines
Canoe sprint
Canoe slalom
Wildwater canoeing
Canoe marathon
Canoe Polo
Canoe Sailing
Dragon Boat
Canoe freestyle
Canoe ocean racing

Championships
European Canoe Sprint Championships - annual event, established in 1933, discontinued in 1969, reinstated in 1997
European Junior and U23 Canoe Sprint Championships - annual event
European Canoe Slalom Championships - annual event, established in 1996
European Junior and U23 Canoe Slalom Championships - annual event
European Wildwater Championships - biennial event, established in 1997
European Junior Wildwater Championships - biennial event
European Canoe Marathon Championships - annual event, established in 1995
European Canoe Ocean Racing Championships - biennial event
European Canoe Polo Championship - biennial event
European Canoe Freestyle Championships - biennial event
European Dragon Boat Championships - biennial event

Board of directors

Albert Woods, President
Miroslav Haviar, Vice President
Jaroslav Pollert, Vice President
Branko Lovric, Secretary General

Members

References

External links
Official website

Canoeing governing bodies
Organizations based in Zagreb
Sports governing bodies in Europe